James Travis Trimble Jr. (born September 13, 1932) is a senior United States district judge of the United States District Court for the Western District of Louisiana.

Education and career

Born in Bunkie, Louisiana, Trimble received a Bachelor of Arts from Louisiana State University in 1955 and a Bachelor of Laws from Louisiana State University Law School in 1956. He was a United States Air Force JAG Corps officer from 1956 to 1959. He was in private practice in Alexandria, Louisiana from 1959 to 1986, and served as a United States magistrate judge for the United States District Court for the Western District of Louisiana from 1986 to 1991.

Federal judicial service

Trimble was nominated by President George H. W. Bush on June 27, 1991, to a seat on the United States District Court for the Western District of Louisiana vacated by Judge Earl Ernest Veron. He was confirmed by the United States Senate on September 12, 1991, and received his commission on September 16, 1991. He assumed senior status on September 13, 2002.

References

Sources

1932 births
Living people
Judges of the United States District Court for the Western District of Louisiana
Louisiana State University alumni
Louisiana State University Law Center alumni
United States district court judges appointed by George H. W. Bush
20th-century American judges
United States Air Force officers
United States magistrate judges
People from Bunkie, Louisiana
Military personnel from Louisiana
21st-century American judges